German Eighth Army may refer to:

 8th Army (German Empire)
 8th Army (Wehrmacht)